The 1932 United States presidential election in Michigan took place on November 8, 1932, as part of the 1932 United States presidential election. Voters chose 19 representatives, or electors, to the Electoral College, who voted for president and vice president.

Michigan was won by the Democratic candidate Franklin D. Roosevelt, who defeated incumbent Republican Herbert Hoover, receiving 52.36% of the popular vote and the states 19 electoral votes.

As a result of his victory, Roosevelt became the first Democratic presidential candidate since Grover Cleveland in 1892 to get electoral votes from Michigan as well as the first since Franklin Pierce in 1852 to win the state entirely.

This was the first time since the creation of the Republican Party that a Democrat won Michigan, as the state voted straight Republican in all but one election from 1856 to 1928.

This is the third most recent election in which Michigan voted for a different candidate than Pennsylvania, a phenomenon that has only been repeated twice since, in 1940, and 1976.

Results

Results by county

See also
 United States presidential elections in Michigan

References

Michigan
1932
1932 Michigan elections